In 2012, the Campeonato Brasileiro Série B, the second level of the Brazilian League, was contested by 20 clubs from May 19 until November 24, 2012. The top four teams in the table have qualified to the Campeonato Brasileiro Série A to be contested in 2013, meanwhile the bottom four were relegated to Campeonato Brasileiro Série C. It's considered the sixth best "second division" of the world.

Teams

Stadia and locations

League table

Results

 

Campeonato Brasileiro Série B seasons
2
Brazil